Catanomistis is a genus of moths of the family Xyloryctidae. It contains only one species, Catanomistis loxophracta, which is found in Madagascar.

See also
 List of moths of Madagascar

References

Meyrick, 1933a. Exotic Microlepidoptera 4. - — 4(12–14):353–448.
Viette, 1955. Etude des types de Microlépidoptères (Tineidae s.l.) malgaches de Meyrick du Muséum de Vienne. - Annalen des Naturhistorischen Museums in Wien 60:279–286.

Xyloryctidae
Moths of Madagascar
Monotypic moth genera
Taxa named by Edward Meyrick
Moths described in 1933
Xyloryctidae genera